Pascoe Vale Girls' College is a public, girls' high school located in Pascoe Vale, a suburb of Melbourne, Victoria, Australia. It offers schooling for approximately 1100 students from years 7 to 12.

House system
The school is divided into four different houses:

 Cowan (green), named after Edith Cowan
 Wake (red), named after Nancy Wake
 Melba (blue), named after Nelly Melba
 Alberti (yellow), named after Susan Alberti

History
Pascoe Vale Girls School opened in 1956 with an enrolment of 115 girls. Until the completion of the first section of building, classes were conducted in the Holy Trinity Parish Hall in Pleasant Street, and the Central Progress Association Hall in Park Street. Miss K.D Meldrum was appointed as the first Head Mistress. Classes were conducted in the buildings on the permanent site in Lake Avenue in February 1957. By this time the school enrolment had risen to 500 students. The second and third sections of the main school were completed and occupied by 1962. A foundation ceremony was held, at which the Director of Education, Mr. A. McDonell, unveiled a plaque to commemorate the completion of the main building.
In 1963 Miss E.D Daniel was appointed Head Mistress. Miss Daniel strove to raise the status of girls and women and to forge attitudes for girls to reach their academic potential and seek professional and leadership roles in the community.
Pascoe Vale Girls lost its "Girls Domestic School" stigma and became a High School in 1966. In 1968, the E.D Daniel Assembly Hall was officially opened, and enrolments continued to increase, despite the fact that there was no sixth form and the most talented students had to transfer to other schools to continue their final year of education.
In 1975 Mr E. De Motte was appointed Principal.

A Commonwealth Science block was added to the site and the George O'Brien Oval was named after the School Council President who had served the school for 18 years. The student population grew to 825 and the E.D Motte Library was built.
The current principal, Miss Helen Jackson took over in 1987. In 1991, Pascoe Vale Girls became a Secondary College.
1995 heralded a new era when, under the Schools of the Future program, Pascoe Vale Girls Secondary College officially became a self-managing one and in 2002 was renamed Pascoe Vale Girls College. With a population of 1,353 girls, the college attracts students from a wide geographical area and from diverse cultural backgrounds.

In 2009, the school received AUD $6.3 million for renovations and new buildings, which was completed in 2011. The school's previous principal, Miss Helen Jackson, is the longest serving principal in Victoria, with over 60 years of teaching experience. Miss Jackson suffered a stroke at age 84 and has since stepped down as principal. The current principal, Kay Peddle, was appointed in 2015.

A notable ex-student is Colleen Hewett. 

The school is remembered affectionately as "Paco Pound".

See also
List of schools in Victoria
Victorian Certificate of Education
Head of the River (Victoria)

References

External links
Pascoe Vale Girls' College website

Rock Eisteddfod Challenge participants
Girls' schools in Victoria (Australia)
Public high schools in Victoria (Australia)
Educational institutions established in 1956
1956 establishments in Australia
Buildings and structures in the City of Merri-bek